The Florida–LSU football rivalry, also known as the Swamp Bowl, is an American college football rivalry between the Florida Gators football team of the University of Florida and LSU Tigers football team of Louisiana State University. Although both universities were founding members of the Southeastern Conference (SEC) in December 1932, the Gators and Tigers did not meet on the gridiron until 1937, and have been annual opponents only since 1971. When the SEC instituted divisional play in 1992, Florida was placed in the SEC Eastern Division and LSU in the Western Division, and Florida and LSU were selected as permanent cross-division rivals. The Gators and Tigers have combined to win five national championships and eleven SEC titles over the past two decades.

Game results 
The series is tied, 33–33–3. The longest winning streak in the series is held by Florida, with nine victories from 1988 to 1996. LSU's longest winning streak is four, from 1977 to 1980 and from 2019 to 2022.

The road team in the series has been unusually successful in recent years. Since the 2001 game inclusive, the home team in the series has posted a record of 11–11. Florida has won two and LSU has won three national titles during that time period and have boasted impressive home records against other opponents.

Notable games

1937: First meeting
The first game in the series was a 19–0 victory for LSU at Tiger Stadium on September 25, 1937. It was the opening game of the season and played in front of a crowd of 15,000. LSU was the defending SEC champion, while Florida was coming off a 4–6 season in 1936. Both teams were coached by men who were later inducted into the College Football Hall of Fame: Bernie Moore for LSU and Josh Cody for Florida. Tigers sophomore quarterback Young Bussey provided most of the team's offense, scoring two touchdowns and kicking the only successful extra point. One of LSU's three pass completions in the game was a 40-yard strike from Bussey to future Hall of Fame end Ken Kavanaugh that put them at the Florida 2-yard line. Two other pass attempts were intercepted by Florida's Walter "Tiger" Mayberry, a star on both offense and defense. LSU out-gained Florida in rushing yards 273–51, passing yards 73–0 (Florida attempted only one pass in the game, which fell incomplete), and converted 18 first downs to Florida's 3.

1960: Wristband robbery
The Tigers were favored in 1960 in Baton Rouge. On the first play from scrimmage, Florida quarterback Larry Libertore ran for a 66-yard touchdown. Throughout the rest of the first half, Florida's offense stalled and LSU quarterback Jimmy Field effectively moved the ball, using plays from his wristband. But in the second quarter, with LSU up 10–7, the Gators sent a nine-man blitz against Field. He never saw it coming, and a sea of Gators piled on top of him. When he came out of the mass of bodies, his play-calling wristband was gone. The Gators then held Field to just 12 yards passing in the second half, with a lone first down. The Gators came back to win 13–10, Billy Cash kicking two field goals, and after the game a Gator coach gave the wristband to an official, saying one of his players had found it on the field.

1964: Hurricane delay I
During the buildup to the 1964 game in Baton Rouge, LSU was a Sugar Bowl favorite. Florida, though unranked, was led by an up-and-coming young player (and future Heisman Trophy winner) named Steve Spurrier. Then, after being delayed several weeks to the season finale due to Hurricane Hilda, the game ended up being anticlimactic with the Gators rolling to a 20–6 win over the No. 7 Tigers. Particularly noteworthy is the fact that it was Spurrier's first win over LSU – the first of a long win streak that he would have over the Tigers as a player and head coach.

1989: College football's first "overtime" game
This game was jokingly referred to as an "overtime" game in Steve Harvey's nationally syndicated "Bottom Ten" column. After LSU hit a field goal to tie it at 13 with 1:19 left, Florida drove from their 20 to LSU's 27. Emmitt Smith was tackled at the LSU 24 inbounds with 18 seconds left. Florida scrambled to get back to the line of scrimmage to snap the ball, which they did with 3 seconds left. Kyle Morris managed to throw it out of bounds with 1 second left, but the clock still ran out, almost exactly like what happened at the end of the 2009 Big 12 Championship Game between #3 Texas and #22 Nebraska. Fireworks were set off over Tiger Stadium in celebration for holding off a late Gator comeback, even though it was right as Florida was sending its special teams unit onto the field. The second was added back to the clock, allowing Arden Czyzewski to attempt, and hit, a 41-yard field goal as time expired to win it 16–13. The unexpected setback sent LSU into a losing streak and its first losing season since they went 4–7 as well in 1983. The manner in which LSU lost the game helped push them into the top spot of that week's Bottom Ten.

1997: LSU's revenge
The previous season, the Gators won the national championship and thrashed LSU 56–13, and they came into the game favored. But it was LSU who jumped out to a big early lead, scoring two touchdowns in the first 8 minutes on runs by Herb Tyler and Tommy Banks. The Gators came right back with two touchdown runs by Fred Taylor, each of which capped off an 80-yard drive.

Then, Doug Johnson threw an ill-advised pass, and Cedric Donaldson picked it off and returned it for a touchdown to give LSU a 21–14 lead. The Gators' frustration mounted when another Johnson pass was picked off, this time by Mark Roman, and when Herb Tyler scored another touchdown to give LSU a 28–14 lead with 11:40 to go, the Gators appeared to be in big trouble.

Undaunted, Johnson responded with a 13-play, 78-yard drive that ended with Fred Taylor getting into the end zone to make it 28–21. LSU did nothing with their next possession, and Doug Johnson began moving the ball downfield again. He then faced a rush on a third and two and threw up a Hail Mary which was intercepted by Raion Hill. The Tigers held on for the 28–21 upset. Kevin Faulk appeared on the next week's cover of Sports Illustrated.

2003: LSU's only loss 
The beleaguered Gators, under second year coach Ron Zook, took on #6 LSU and Nick Saban with freshman Chris Leak making his third start at quarterback for Florida.

The Gators were off to their worst start since 1979, with a 3–3 record to begin the year. The previous week, Florida lost to Ole Miss at home and Coach Ron Zook was already on the hot seat. However, Florida's freshman quarterback Chris Leak would help the Gators turn their season around. Leak shrugged off six sacks, the Tiger Stadium noise and a pressing defense to lead the Gators to a 19–7 victory over LSU with two separate touchdown passes to running backs Ran Carthon and Ciatrick Fason out of the backfield. Florida also got a massive game out of their defense, including cornerback Keiwan Ratliff, who had two interceptions and shut LSU down. This shocking loss in Death Valley would be the Tigers' only defeat of the season, as Nick Saban would go on to win his first BCS National Championship and his only title with LSU.

2006: Tebow's series debut
The 9th ranked Tigers visited the 5th ranked Gators favored by a point and a half. Early in the first quarter, JaMarcus Russell connected with Jacob Hester for a touchdown.

However, Florida's freshman quarterback Tim Tebow would help the Gators turn the tide. While the Gators' starting QB was senior Chris Leak, coach Urban Meyer had been rotating Tebow, a highly touted recruit, into the huddle for a few series every game. Tebow made the most of his opportunities against LSU, accounting for three touchdowns, including his first career passing touchdown on "the jump pass" to tight end Tate Casey. The Gators won 23–10 and went on to win the BCS National Championship.

2007: 5-for-5 on 4th down
The 9th-ranked Gators traveled to Baton Rouge to take on the top-ranked Tigers. Early on, it appeared that Florida was heading for a big win when they raced out to a 10–0 lead. The two teams then traded scores, scoring two touchdowns each to make it 24–14 late in the third quarter.

LSU rallied behind Matt Flynn to score a touchdown to cut it to 24–21. Then they stopped Tebow and got the ball back with just a few minutes left. They faced a fourth and two in their own territory, and got the first down. Not even a minute later, they faced another fourth and two and again converted.

From the Florida 12-yard line, once again, the Tigers faced a fourth and 1. But rather than kick the game-tying field goal, Les Miles ordered a dive play. And for the fifth time in the game, the Tigers converted. Soon after, LSU took the lead when running back Jacob Hester bulled across the end zone with 1:09 left and LSU hung on, 28–24.  The Tigers, though they would finish the season with two losses, went on to win the BCS National Championship.

2010: The fake field goal
In a back-and-forth game, LSU pulled ahead 26–14 early in the 4th quarter. But Andre Debose answered with a kickoff return for a touchdown, and following a defensive stand by the Gators, Florida got the ball  with 7 minutes left and trailing 26–21. A long drive ended when running back Mike Gillislee ran into the end zone with three minutes left. Quarterback John Brantley completed the two-point conversion to Omarius Hines to increase the Gator lead to 29–26 with just under 3 minutes left.

LSU's Jarrett Lee then led a drive that found LSU at the Gator 36-yard line with 34 seconds to go. LSU coach Les Miles ordered a 53-yard field goal attempt by Josh Jasper. Holder Derek Helton blindly pitched the ball over his head on a fake field goal. It hit the ground, but took a perfect bounce right into the arms of Jasper, who picked it up and crossed the first down line.

Lee then threw a 28-yard pass to Terrence Toliver to the Florida 3-yard line with 18 seconds left. After spiking the ball, then an incomplete pass, Lee tossed the game winner to Toliver with 6 seconds left; LSU won 33–29.

2016: Hurricane delay II
This game was originally scheduled to be played in Gainesville on October 8, but due to Hurricane Matthew, the game was canceled. After much deliberation between Florida Athletic Director Jeremy Foley, LSU Athletic Director Joe Alleva and SEC Commissioner Greg Sankey, both schools agreed to play the game on November 19 in Baton Rouge, with Florida hosting the 2017 (originally scheduled to play in Baton Rouge) and 2018 matchups in Gainesville.

The first half was a defensive battle, with LSU leading 7–3. The Tigers drove the ball inside the Florida 5-yard line to start the second half but came away with zero points after a fumbled snap on a short field goal attempt resulted in a desperation throw by the holder that fell incomplete in the end zone. The Gators immediately took advantage of that LSU miscue on the very next play by scoring a 98-yard touchdown pass on first down from graduate transfer quarterback Austin Appleby to freshman receiver Tyrie Cleveland, who shook off an LSU defender while speeding to the end zone to take a 10–7 lead. After an exchange of punts, LSU scored a field goal to tie the game at 10. Florida kicker Eddy Pineiro then made a pair of field goals to give the Gators a 16–10 lead late in the fourth quarter, the second field goal being set up by an LSU lost fumble on a kickoff return.

After driving down the field with less than a minute left, LSU had first-and-goal at UF's 6-yard line with 38 seconds left. The Tigers picked up 5 yards on the first two plays, both handoffs to running back Derrius Guice but were stuffed at the 1-yard line on third-and-goal on a full back handoff. With its final timeout, LSU stopped the clock with 3 seconds left. On the final play of the game, LSU lined up in the goal-line formation. From the snap, the play looked broken, with transfer quarterback Danny Etling spinning to the right on what appeared to be a handoff. However, running back Derrius Guice was late off of the snap, forcing Etling to pitch the ball backwards to the 6-yard line. Guice attempted to find a hole, starting to run right but cutting back left and diving through the air from the two yard line, but was met by Gators defensive back Marcell Harris and defensive linemen Cece Jefferson and Jordan Sherit, who wrapped up his legs, stopping him at the goal line. While coming down, Guice fumbled the ball but it was recovered by Gators cornerback Quincy Wilson at the half yard line. Florida players and staff stormed the field in celebration after pulling off what would be considered the biggest upset of its season. Linebacker Rayshad Jackson and wide receiver Antonio Callaway celebrated by running through the end zone with a Gator flag in hand. Florida head coach Jim McElwain became the first coach in conference history to lead his team to the conference championship game in his first two seasons.

2020: Shoe throw
Florida, ranked No. 6 and 8–1, faced an unranked 3–5 LSU team at home in a game that had been postponed due to a COVID-19 outbreak on the Gators football team. The game was expected to be a blowout win for Florida, favored by more than three touchdowns. However, the game would end up being close throughout. Tied at 34 near the end of the fourth quarter and with the fog becoming extremely thick in The Swamp, Florida stopped LSU on third down. Before the Tigers could punt the ball, however, as Kole Taylor's shoe came off, Florida cornerback Marco Wilson proceeded to grab it and throw it twenty yards downfield. This resulted in an unsportsmanlike conduct penalty, giving LSU a first down to keep their drive alive. Cade York hit a career-long 57-yard field goal to give LSU a 37–34 lead with 23 seconds left. Florida had a chance to force overtime in the final seconds, but Evan McPherson's 51-yard field goal attempt sailed wide left to seal LSU's upset of the Gators, effectively ending their chances at the College Football Playoff. Wilson was heavily criticized online.

See also 

 List of NCAA college football rivalry games

References

Further reading 

Carlson, Norm, University of Florida Football Vault: The History of the Florida Gators, Whitman Publishing, LLC, Atlanta, Georgia (2007).  .
Golenbock, Peter, Go Gators!  An Oral History of Florida's Pursuit of Gridiron Glory, Legends Publishing, LLC, St. Petersburg, Florida (2002).  .
Hairston, Jack, Tales from the Gator Swamp: A Collection of the Greatest Gator Stories Ever Told, Sports Publishing, LLC, Champaign, Illinois (2002).  .
McCarthy, Kevin M.,  Fightin' Gators: A History of University of Florida Football, Arcadia Publishing, Mount Pleasant, South Carolina (2000).  .
McEwen, Tom, The Gators: A Story of Florida Football, The Strode Publishers, Huntsville, Alabama (1974).  .
 
Nash, Noel, ed., The Gainesville Sun Presents The Greatest Moments in Florida Gators Football, Sports Publishing, Inc., Champaign, Illinois (1998).  .
 
 

College football rivalries in the United States
Florida Gators football
LSU Tigers football